Rajagopal P. V. is an Indian Gandhian activist, a former Vice Chairman of the New Delhi Gandhi Peace Foundation, and the president and founding member of Ekta Parishad. In 1972, Rajagopal started working alongside Gandhian stalwarts J.P. Narayan and Subba Rao to disarm 578 bandits in the Chambal region of India. Thereafter, the young Gandhian stayed away from dealing with direct violence and focused on the people of Adivasis, bonded labourers, and other landless communities affected by poverty and exploitation.

From 1989 to 2018, Rajagopal trained thousands of rural young people to serve in villages as trainer-leaders to build up community leadership and popular action. This culminated in many efforts of state and national activism. An example of the latter occurred in 2007 when 25,000 landless poor, mainly Adivasis, marched a 350-kilometre pilgrimage from Gwalior to Delhi to demand the land reforms promised upon independence. The Union government agreed to the demands made, leading to the implementation of the Forest Rights Act.

A second effort of national activism occurred in 2012 when Rajagopal led a march of 100,000 people to the capital to demand popular control over land and resources for livelihood. The effort resulted in the signing of a ten point agreement with the Union government.

In 2018, Rajagopal embarked on a more ambitious agenda of mobilizing one million people to nonviolently address their livelihood rights. For Mohandas Gandhi's 150th birthday in 2019, Rajagopal planned to take his message worldwide as a way to spread peace and nonviolence.

Rajagopal's main contributions to Indian society are the method of a nonviolent approach for the addressing of grievances shared by millions of Indians and the enhancement of dialogue with the government.

Biography 
Rajagopal was born in 1948, the fourth of five children, in Thillenkery, a village in the modern-day state of Kerala in southern India. His full name is Rajagopal Puthan Veetil, but he now chooses to use only his first name in public in order to avoid any caste-related stereotyping that might be associated with his full name. Rajagopal's father was an activist fighting for India's independence and therefore was frequently separated from his family. Rajagopal attended the grade school at Seva Mandir, being taught in Malayalam language. The school followed Gandhi's philosophical principles with regard to life and work in a community. He later studied classical Indian dance and music, prior to completing his education at  Sevagram, Gandhi's Ashram in Maharashtra, with a degree in agricultural engineering. This is also where Rajagopal learned to speak English.

In the early 1970s, he worked in the violence-ridden area of Chambal in Madhya Pradesh to help rehabilitate dacoits.

Since 2001, Rajagopal is married to Jill Carr-Harris, a Canadian fellow social activist.

2011-Till Date

 Special Invitee to Sarva Seva Sangh- A national body of Gandhian organization.
 Member  of Gandhi Seva Sangh- An organization promoting Gandhian values and ideas through publications.
 Member  of the Planning Commission, Govt. of India, Working Group for the 12th Five Year Plan on Disadvantaged Farmers.
 Member of All India Nai Talim Society, an institute created to promote the educational system proposed by Gandhi.
 Organized a long march Jansatyagraha of 100, 000 people from Gwalior to Delhi on the issue of land reforms. On 11 October Minister, Rural Development, Government of India signed a ten points agreements between Jansatyagrah and Government of India
 As Member, Taskforce on land issue constituted by the Government of India under the ministry of Rural development.
 Chair of Social Justice of Cody International Institute in Antignesh, Halifax, Canada. This institute was established in the name of Mosus Cody within the campus of the St. Francis University to promote the agenda of Justice.
 Member of the Jury - Award committee of Jamnalal Bajaj International Award for Gandhian work outside India.
 Managing Trustee of IGINP (International Gandhian Initiative for Nonviolence and Peace) an organization established in Madurai, South India to promote the theme of nonviolence through research publication and trainings.
 Provided support to local group in Georgia and Armenia to set up a Gandhi Foundation.
 Facilitated the process of establishing Gandhi Chair in the Georgian – American University of Tbilisi, Georgia.
 Spoke at the India Ideas Conclave organize by India Foundation to take forward the churning of ideas for the peace, progress and prosperity of the world in the 21st century.
 Presentation on bonded labor at the Planning Commission of India office in Chennai.
 Led Jan- Samvad Yatra, Year long dialogue Yatra from Kanyakumary to Gwalior (2 October 2011 – 28 September 2012) covering a 350 districts and a distance of 80000 KM.
 Organized eight state level youth camps during the year with an average of 150 participants in each. This was designed to create new generation leadership who will take responsibility to protect the human rights and livelihood rights of the marginalized communities
 Long march of 5000 people (mainly agricultural laborers and small farmers) to Delhi to challenge the Land Ordinance. 
 Steering Committee member of Jal Jan Jodo Abhiyaan.

2010-2001

 Actively involved in coordinating rehabilitation of Tsunami effected people of Tamil Nadu and Kerala.
 Jury member in the National Innovation  Award Committee India.
 Member of the project Steering committee set up by Ministry of Tribal Affairs, Govt. of India (NGO Section).
 Member of National Council of Rural Institute under the Ministry of Human Resource Development, Govt. of India.
 Member of the subcommittee on land relations constituted by the Planning Commission, Government of India.
 Member of the Investigation Team (PESA Area) constituted by the Ministry of Panchayat, Government of India.
 India Co-ordinator for the campaign Disarmament to combat poverty. A campaign jointly organised by France, India and Pakistan.
 march of 500 social activists from Gwalior to Delhi to demand a pro poor land reform policy.
 Convenor of South Asia Peace Alliance (SAPA) jointly organised by India, Nepal, Pakistan, Sri Lanka and supported by QPSW.
 Chairman of the Selection Committee for Vice Chancellor for Gandhigram University, Dindigal, Tamil Nadu.
 Organized Janadesh 2007- A march of 25000 people from Gwalior to Delhi to demand a pro poor land reform policy.
 Member of National council for Land reforms under the chairmanship of Prime Minister of India.
 As Member of the Palestine Tribunal , an international group promoting peace between Israel and Palestine.
 As Member of Barcelona Consensus- An international group trying to address conflict and promote peace.
 Vice Chairman of National Council of Rural Institute under the Ministry of Human Resource Development, Govt. of India (continued until 2011).
 Member – Dignity International- An international organization working with urban poor (Headquarters in Jakarta).
 Organized a padyatra Against Injustice and Violence" covering 216 kilometers from 15 April to 1 May 2002 in Morena district of Chambal Valley.
 Organized "Bhoo-Adhikar Yatra" in Chhattisgarh ,Bundelkhand, Baghelkhand, Mahakoshal ,Orissa (7 Districts), Bihar (6 Districts) and in the tsunami affected area of Tamil Nadu.

2000-1991      

 Convener of Peoples Organization EKTA PARISHAD, a mass based organization  to promote the concept of people as main players in democracy, non-violent action for socio-economic change and people's capacity to make the state accountable.
 Resource Person to various programs organized by National and state government including the Academy of Administration. 
 Secretary of Gandhi Peace Foundation, New Delhi, actively engaged in a process of peace building in conflict areas. 
 Secretary cum Treasurer of Focus on the Global South, a body set-up to promote micro-macro linkage in analysis and action. (Head office Bangkok, Thailand).
 Chair of India's north region advisory committee of  CAA (Community Aid Abroad), an Australian NGO supporting voluntary efforts in India.
 President of Madhya Pradesh Sevak Sangh, a Gandhian –Sarvodaya body, specially set up to support the Gandhian, Sarvodaya work in Madhya Pradesh.
 Member of State level Task Force constituted by the Govt. of Madhya Pradesh for solving land problems in Madhya Pradesh.
 Member of  Madhya Pradesh Bio-diversity Board constituted by the Govt. of Madhya Pradesh.
 Member of Anti Liquor Board constituted by the Govt. of Madhya Pradesh.
 Led the  "Bhoo-Adhikar Satyagraha Padyatra" in Madhya Pradesh, covering more than 3000 kilometers in 190 days 10 December 1999 to 18 June 2000) to ensure right to live with dignity for tribals and dalits.

1990-1981

 National Convener of P C I (Partners Council India), a network of voluntary bodies that were engaged among the poorer section of the society.
 Asia representative of inter-continental council set up by BAM - International (Headquarters in Paris) to promote the concept of International solidarity and partnership in developmental action with  special focus on empowerment of the poor for poverty eradication.
 Enquiry Commissioner of the Supreme Court of India on Bonded Labour. Releasing and rehabilitating more than 6000 bonded laborers in Madhya Pradesh, Uttar Pradesh, Rajasthan, Tamil Nadu and Andhra Pradesh.
 Enquiry Commissioner on Bonded Labour on a P I L of Chhattisgarh. Facilitated release of 4000 bonded labours from the farm sector.
 Advisor to Oxfam Initiative in the Bundelkhand region of Madhya Pradesh. 
 Organized regional and national level youth training programs to promote the   concept of non-violent action for social change.
 Undertook educational and rural development activities in Chambal region to re-establish peace and as a result large number of rural youth got mobilized for action.
 Promoted village industry with the support of Gandhi Ashram Chuchuyimlang (State of Nagaland, northeast border of India) to create employment for Naga youth.
 Consultant to Nehru Seva Sangh Banpur, State of Orissa, mainly in the field of skill development and tribal development.

Janadesh 2007

After consolidating a membership of 200,000 people (the majority are women) across six states, Rajagopal began using the Gandhian technique of foot-march or padayatra to galvanize greater support among the poor. With a track record of ten state level foot-marches, he led a national march to Delhi in October 2007. In the march, Janadesh 2007 25,000 people marched 340 kilometers from Gwalior to Delhi and compelled the Government to take action in land reforms and forest rights.

Jan Satyagraha 2012

The Jan Satyagraha 2012 Yatra, which started from Gwalior Oct 2, had intended to reach Delhi on Oct 28 if no agreement was reached with the government. Nearly 35,000 people were part of the protest march.
Though the Land Reform Commission has issued its report, the government has not yet accepted it.

Jan Andolan 2018 
In October 2018, Rajagopal led a march from Gwalior to Morena with around 25,000 people asking for land rights and tribal rights. Initially the march was planned from Haryana to New Delhi. The march took place in the context of the 2018 Madhya Pradesh Legislative election and some months ahead of 2019 national elections. Political leaders such as Madhya Pradesh Chief Minister Shivraj Singh Chouhan addressed the marchers in Gwalior before their departure, promising to create a committee to address land rights issues. According to Ekta Parishad, the marchers were not satisfied with the proposals and decided to go ahead with the march. In Morena, leaders from Indian National Congress, the main opposition party addressed the marchers and promised if elected to satisfy their demands. Ekta Parishad indicated that they were satisfied with these commitments and decided to stop marching and not to continue to New Delhi, as initially planned.

Jai Jagat 2020 
In 2015, Rajagopal launched, with Ekta Parishad, the extraordinary challenge of Jai Jagat, building upon existing groups, mainly in India and Europe. The core vision of Jai Jagat is to create a space where groups and movements can come together to make change nonviolently and address issues related to justice and peace. The urgency of having such convergence is to change global public opinion to enhance the emergence of an alternative development process that is pro-people, pro-poor and pro-nature. The 2019-2020 Global Peace March (Delhi-Geneva) reached individuals, groups and organizations outside those historical Ekta circles and created a dynamic in many countries. The March had to overcome many hurdles and was suspended halfway in Armenia in March 2020, because of COVID-19. A few marches to Geneva at the end of September 2020 marked the last significant mobilization, at least outside India, under the umbrella of Jai Jagat. Since then, initiatives have been taken, such as the organization of marches or a cartoon exhibition, by local and regional groups.

Land reform through nonviolent action
In the context of the continuing growth of Naxalism in central rural India, Rajagopal's organization of Ekta Parishad with its mobilization of tribal peoples, women and youth as well as its advocacy of land reform, is one of the most successful nonviolent alternatives.

New land reforms, 2014 and conflicts

The Modi government has proposed two major changes in the land acquisition act:-

1. It seeks to dilute provisions such as the mandatory consent of 70 percent of those affected in case of public-private partnership (PPP) projects.

2. It removes the provision of mandatory requirement for a time-bound Social Impact Assessment for land acquisitions.

Rajagopal accuses Modi of being pro-corporate and claims that it will further aggravate the difference between the rich and poor in the country.

Documentation
Articles:

 Voice of Hope and Voice for Change (English)– A collection of articles by Rajagopal P.V. published by National Center for Advocacy Studies, Pune.
 Land for Life (English) A collection of village data during the foot march by Rajagopal P.V. published by National Center for Advocacy Studies, Pune.
 Main ne Dekha Hain (Hindi)-A collection of village stories during the foot march by Rajagopal P.V. published by Ekta Parishad.
 Pagdandiyom par paav (Hindi)-A collection of village people's story during the foot march by Rajagopal P.V. published by Ekta Parishad.
 Gulamon ki Basti se Gujar raha hoon  (Hindi)-A collection of village based story during the foot march by Rajagopal P.V. published by Ekta Parishad.
 Jo Ghar Khoya Apana (Hindi)-A collection of village data during the foot march by Rajagopal P.V. published by Ekta Parishad.
 Sab ki apani Ho Jameen (Hindi)-A collection of village data during the foot march by Rajagopal P.V. published by Ekta Parishad.
 Journey to the other India – a collection of articles in English during the year long samwad yatra in 2011 – 2012.
 The legacy of Gandhi», Rajagopal P.V. – a life for non-violent resistance by Carmen Zanella of Switzerland.
 Biography of Rajagopal by Dr.Julius Ruibke of German.

Audio-Visual

 "Janadesh" (People's Verdict)   A Film on 25000 people on foot in 2007 from Gwalior to Delhi  (English, Hindi, Spanish, German and French) Film makers from France, Switzerland, Spain and India.
 "Land First"  A Film on Orissa foot march by Amanda, England.
 "Is Small still Beautiful"  A Film Broadcast on BBC News, Traccy Winchester, England.
 "Raja's Raise" A Film based on a story of Elephant, Karl Saurer from Switzerland.
 "Ahimsa"(based on Non-Violence training and Social action), Karl Saurer from Switzerland.
 "Jansatyagrah"(Truth Force)  Rajagopal and his initiatives, Vikram Nayak, New Delhi.
 "Peoples Movement Processes",Praveen Pagare, Nasik.
 "Jan Chetana Ka Uday" Struggle of Peoples Movement,Ritu Datta , New Delhi.
 "Manzil ki Aur" Community based Nonviolent Struggle for right, Ritu Datta, New Delhi.
 "Millions can walk" Film on Jansatyagraha by Christoph Schaub, Switzerland.
 Nari Shakti Zindabad (Women Empowerment & Leadership), Praveen Pagare, Nasik.
 Interview on DD National - Aaj Savere Program, DD National.

Awards 
In 2014, he received the Indira Gandhi Award for National Integration, an award granted annually by the Indian National Congress party.

References

Activists from Kerala
Nonviolence advocates
Indian anti-globalization activists
Living people
1948 births